Elk Township is the name of several places in the U.S. state of Pennsylvania:
Elk Township, Chester County, Pennsylvania
Elk Township, Clarion County, Pennsylvania
Elk Township, Tioga County, Pennsylvania
Elk Township, Warren County, Pennsylvania

See also
Elk Creek Township, Erie County, Pennsylvania
Elk Lick Township, Somerset County, Pennsylvania
Elkland Township, Sullivan County, Pennsylvania

Pennsylvania township disambiguation pages